Lincoln County is a county located in the U.S. state of Washington. As of the 2020 census, the population was 10,876, making it the fifth-least populous county in the state. The county seat and largest city is Davenport.

Lincoln County was created out of Whitman County in November 1883. It is named for Abraham Lincoln, the 16th president of the United States.

History
In 1883, Lincoln County was created from a portion of Spokane County, and four days later a portion of its area was peeled off to create Douglas County. There have been no further alterations to its boundary since that time. Its 2,317 square miles make it #8 in size in the state.

Centuries ago, the area now covered by Lincoln County contained an east–west passageway used by indigenous peoples. A spring near the present-day Davenport created a large overnight camping place.

The early exploration of the Northwest Territory by Lewis and Clark did not reach as far north as the Lincoln County expanses. The first recorded entry by European explorers was of David Thompson, a scout for the North West Company, who traversed the area in 1811. He noted physical locations in present-day Lincoln County. He described Hell Gate Rapid (calling it 'Strong Rapid'). That stretch of the Columbia River is now tame, because of the presence of Grand Coulee Dam. After this, there was considerable exploration by fur trappers and others, including famed Scotch botanist David Douglas in 1826.

Possibly the first permanent non-indigenous resident of the area was R.M. Bacon, originally from Boston, who began raising cattle around Crab Creek in 1871. When the first post office was established in the county, Bacon was its postmaster.

Emigration into the area accelerated in the late 1870s. Completion of the Northern Pacific Railway in 1883, and construction of Fort Spokane (1880-1882) hastened settlement.

Geography and climate
Lincoln County lies on the Channelled Scablands, known as the Big Bend Plateau. It lies 1,500-2,500 feet above sea level, with a system of channels eroded into bedrock by glacial rivers and streams, flowing from northeastern Washington.

Lincoln County climate is hot/dry in the summer, cold/moderately humid in the winter. Due to the relatively level terrain (about 1,200 feet difference from lowest to highest elevations), temperatures tend to vary little from east to west. Precipitation varies from an arid condition in the western part of the county to semi-arid in the northeast. The entire area lies in the dry intermontane basin between the Cascades and the Rocky Mountain System. Precipitation (10-20 inches annual rainfall) is a major controlling factor in agriculture. Precipitation in the Big Bend region is highly variable; from 8 inches in the west to 20 inches in the northeast.

Monthly temperature averages range from below freezing in mid-winter to highs of 65-71 °F in mid-summer.

Geographic features
Channeled Scablands
Columbia River
Crab Creek
Lilienthal Mountain, county high point

Major highways
 Interstate 90
 U.S. Route 2
 U.S. Route 395

Adjacent counties
Okanogan County – northwest
Ferry County – north
Stevens County – northeast
Spokane County – east
Whitman County – southeast
Adams County – south
Grant County – west

National protected area
 Lake Roosevelt National Recreation Area (part)

Demographics

2000 census
As of the census of 2000, there were 10,184 people, 4,151 households, and 2,914 families in the county. The population density was 4 people per square mile (2/km2). There were 5,298 housing units at an average density of 2 per square mile (1/km2). The racial makeup of the county was 95.64% White, 0.23% Black or African American, 1.63% Native American, 0.25% Asian, 0.07% Pacific Islander, 0.58% from other races, and 1.61% from two or more races. 1.88% of the population were Hispanic or Latino of any race. 36.6% were of German, 10.5% English, 9.3% United States or American and 5.8% Irish ancestry.

There were 4,151 households, out of which 29.30% had children under the age of 18 living with them, 60.90% were married couples living together, 6.40% had a female householder with no husband present, and 29.80% were non-families. 26.00% of all households were made up of individuals, and 12.30% had someone living alone who was 65 years of age or older. The average household size was 2.42 and the average family size was 2.91.

In the county, the population was spread out, with 25.30% under the age of 18, 5.20% from 18 to 24, 23.20% from 25 to 44, 27.40% from 45 to 64, and 19.00% who were 65 years of age or older. The median age was 43 years. For every 100 females there were 98.40 males. For every 100 females age 18 and over, there were 94.70 males.

The median income for a household in the county was $35,255, and the median income for a family was $41,269. Males had a median income of $31,086 versus $22,444 for females. The per capita income for the county was $17,888. About 8.40% of families and 12.60% of the population were below the poverty line, including 17.60% of those under age 18 and 7.70% of those age 65 or over.

2010 census
As of the 2010 census, there were 10,570 people, 4,422 households, and 3,059 families residing in the county. The racial makeup of the county was 95.0% white, 1.6% American Indian, 0.4% Asian, 0.3% black or African American, 0.5% from other races, and 2.2% from two or more races. Those of Hispanic or Latino origin made up 2.3% of the population. In terms of ancestry, 42.3% were German, 14.6% were Irish, 13.9% were English, 5.5% were Norwegian, 5.3% were Scotch-Irish, and 3.6% were American.

Of the 4,422 households, 25.9% had children under the age of 18 living with them, 57.3% were married couples living together, 7.7% had a female householder with no husband present, 30.8% were non-families, and 27.1% of all households were made up of individuals. The average household size was 2.37 and the average family size was 2.85. The median age was 47.6 years.

The median income for a household in the county was $45,582 and the median income for a family was $52,083. Males had a median income of $44,491 versus $30,617 for females. The per capita income for the county was $24,757. About 7.1% of families and 12.1% of the population were below the poverty line, including 21.5% of those under age 18 and 6.0% of those age 65 or over.

Government and politics
The county is administered by a three-member Board of Commissioners.

Like neighboring Adams County, Lincoln County is one of the most conservative counties in Washington. The last Democratic presidential candidate to carry the county was Harry Truman in 1948. In 1964, it was one of only three counties in the state to be carried by Barry Goldwater, and was the nation's northernmost county or equivalent to vote for Goldwater. In the last seven elections, no Democratic candidate for president has received more than 36 percent of the county's vote; the last Democratic gubernatorial nominee it backed was Booth Gardner in 1988, during a major drought and farm crisis. In 2016, Donald Trump won over 70 percent of the county's vote.

Economy
The county is dependent on agriculture, primarily wheat farming. Lincoln County is generally considered the second-largest producer of wheat in the United States (following Whitman County, Washington), sometimes producing 25 million bushels (680,000 t) per year. Only about 500,000 of 900,000 acres (2,000 of ) of farmland in the county are planted in any given year due to the practice of typically harvesting one crop every two years ("summer-fallow"), a necessity in a region with only 12 inches (300 mm) of precipitation annually.

Livestock husbandry is also a significant county activity, although to a significantly lower degree. For example, in 1954 the county was #3 in the state for crop income, but was only #21 in the state for income from livestock and livestock products.

Communities

Cities
Davenport (county seat)
Harrington
Sprague

Towns
Almira
Creston
Odessa
Reardan
Wilbur

Unincorporated communities

Clark
Edwall
Irby
Lamona
Lincoln
Mondovi
Mohler
Seven Bays

Ghost towns
Fishtrap
Govan

See also
National Register of Historic Places listings in Lincoln County, Washington

Further reading
Available online through the Washington State Library's Classics in Washington History collection

References

 
1883 establishments in Washington Territory
Populated places established in 1883
Eastern Washington